Soňa Norisová (born 27 August 1973) is a Slovak actress and singer. She received a nomination for Best Actress at the 2014 Sun in a Net Awards for her performance in the 2012 film In the Shadow. Her younger sister, is also an actress. They acted together in the 2001 film Rebelové.

Selected filmography 
Rebelové (2001)
Václav (2007)
Mesto tieňov (television, 2008)
In the Shadow  (2012)

References

External links

1973 births
Living people
Slovak film actresses
Slovak stage actresses
Slovak television actresses
21st-century Slovak women singers
People from Malacky
20th-century Slovak actresses
21st-century Slovak actresses